Trachypepla importuna is a moth of the family Oecophoridae first described by Edward Meyrick in 1927. This moth is regarded as having being introduced to New Zealand and is presumed to be native to Australia. T. importuna has been collected in both the North and South Islands of New Zealand. It inhabits native scrub and adults are on the wing in January and February. The placement of this species in the genus Trachypepla is regarded as being unsatisfactory and in need of revision.

Taxonomy 
This species was first described by Edward Meyrick in 1927 using a male specimen collected by George Hudson in the suburb of Karori in Wellington. George Hudson discussed and illustrated this species in his book The butterflies and moths of New Zealand. The male holotype is held at the Natural History Museum, London. The classification of this moth within the genus Trachypepla is regarded as unsatisfactory and in need of revision. As such this species is currently also known as Trachypepla (s.l.) indolescens.

Description

Meyrick described this species as follows:

Distribution 
T. importuna, although first described from a specimen collected in New Zealand, is regarded as originating from Australia. In New Zealand, this species has been collected in both the North and South Islands.

Habitat
This species inhabits native scrub.

Behaviour 
Adults of this species are on the wing in January and February.

References 

Moths described in 1927
Oecophoridae
Taxa named by Edward Meyrick
Moths of New Zealand
Moths of Australia